"That Ole Devil Called Love" is a song written in 1944 by Allan Roberts and Doris Fisher.  It was first recorded by Billie Holiday, who released it as the B-side of her hit "Lover Man" in 1945.

In 1985, the song was recorded by Alison Moyet, whose version, produced by Pete Wingfield, topped the New Zealand RIANZ chart for 3 weeks and reached number 2 on the UK singles chart.

Alison Moyet version

In 1985, Alison Moyet released her own version of the song as a non-album single. It reached No. 2 in the UK and remained in the charts for ten weeks. A music video was filmed to promote the single, which was directed by Vaughan Arnell and Anthea Benton.

Moyet's version was recorded following the success of her debut album Alf. When CBS suggested releasing a fourth single from the album, Moyet spoke against the idea and suggested she record a cover of "That Ole Devil Called Love" in order to give fans something new. Speaking to the BBC in 2004, Moyet commented on the song: "After my versions of "That Ole Devil Called Love" and "Love Letters" did well, there was definite pressure for me to become some sort of jazz diva."

Reception
Upon release, Marshall O'Leary of Smash Hits did not consider the song to be "one of [her] favourites" but described it as a "smoochy number" and "one to play while you're with your loved one". Peter Trollope of the Liverpool Echo commented: "[Moyet] gets the blues and coaxes it into another smash single that has the look of a number one about it!"

Charts

Weekly charts

Year-end charts

Other Versions
Other artists who have recorded the song include Tony Bennett, Ella Fitzgerald, Diane Schuur, Jeri Southern and Susannah McCorkle.

References

1944 songs
1985 singles
Billie Holiday songs
CBS Records singles
Alison Moyet songs
Songs written by Allan Roberts (songwriter)
Songs written by Doris Fisher (songwriter)
Song recordings produced by Pete Wingfield
Number-one singles in New Zealand